The 1936–37 season was Arsenal's 18th consecutive season in the top division of English football.

Results
Arsenal's score comes first

Legend

Football League First Division

Final League table

FA Cup

Arsenal entered the FA Cup in the third round, in which they were drawn to face Chesterfield.

See also

 1936–37 in English football
 List of Arsenal F.C. seasons

References

English football clubs 1936–37 season
1936-37